Figure skating lifts are required elements in two disciplines of figure skating, pair skating and ice dance. There are five groups of lifts in pair skating, categorized in order of increasing level of difficulty. Judges look for the following when evaluating pair lifts: speed of entry and exit; control of the woman's free leg when she is exiting out of the lift, with the goal of keeping the leg high and sweeping; the position of the woman in the air; the man's footwork; quick and easy changes of position; and the maintenance of flow throughout the lift. Twist lifts are "the most thrilling and exciting component in pair skating". They can also be the most difficult movement to perform correctly. They require more strength and coordination than many other pair elements, and are usually the first or second element in a program. According to the International Skating Union (ISU), "the Woman must be caught in the air at the waist by the Man prior to landing and be assisted to a smooth landing on the ice on a backward outside edge on one foot" during a twist lift. A pair lift and twist lift is required in the short program of pair skating; a well-balanced free skating program in pair skating must include lifts.

The ISU defines dance lifts as "a movement in which one of the partners is elevated with active and/or passive assistance of the other partner to any permitted height, sustained there and set down on the ice". Dance lifts are delineated from pair lifts to ensure that ice dance and pair skating remain separate disciplines. After the judging system changed from the 6.0 system to the ISU Judging System (IJS), dance lifts became more "athletic, dramatic and exciting". There are two types of dance lifts: short lifts, which should be done in under seven seconds; and combination lifts, which should be done in under 12 seconds. A well-balanced free dance program in ice dance must include dance lifts.

Pair skating

Pair lifts 
There are five groups of pair lifts, determined by the hold at the moment the woman passes the man's shoulder. For the 2022-2023 season, any Group Five lasso lift take-off is required in pair skating short programs for both juniors and seniors, and only the prescribed overhead lift is allowed. In the free skate, seniors can perform up to three lifts, but not all from the same group, and the man's lifting arm(s) must be fully extended; juniors can perform up to two lifts, also not all from the same group and with the man's lifting arm(s) also fully extended. If two Group Five lifts are executed, their take-off must be of a different nature; if their take-off is not different, they receive no points for the second executed lift. Judges look for the following when evaluating pair lifts: speed of entry and exit; control of the woman's free leg when she is exiting out of the lift, with the goal of keeping the leg high and sweeping; the position of the woman in the air; the man's footwork; quick and easy changes of position; and the maintenance of flow throughout the lift.

Judges begin counting how many revolutions pair teams execute from the moment when the woman leaves the ice until when the man's arm (or arms) begin to bend after he has made a full extension and the woman begins to descend. If he is in a spread-eagle position or in another sideways position, the rotation count is determined by the position of his front foot at the moment the woman leaves the ice.

A complete pair skating lift must include full extension of the lifting arm or arms, if required for the type of lift being performed. Small lifts, or ones in which the man does not raise his hands higher than his shoulders, or lifts that include movements in which the man holds the woman by the legs, are also allowed. Small lifts can be either descending and ascending or rotational in character. A simple take-off includes, but is not limited to, a change of hand hold during ascent. A difficult take-off includes, but is not limited to, the following: a somersault take-off; a one-hand take-off, an Ina Bauer, a spread-eagle, spirals as the entry curve executed by one or both partners; or a dance lift followed immediately by a pair lift take-off, but when the woman does not touch the ice between each lift. Simple landings include a change of hold during the descent. Difficult landings include, but are not limited to, the following: somersaults; one-hand landings; variations in holds; and spread-eagle positions of the man during dismounting, but "only if the spread-eagle lasts long enough: from the moment the Man starts bending his arms till the moment the Woman is placed on the ice".

There must be one full revolution after a change of hold is made for it to count towards a team's score, but the man can change holds from his left to right arms, or from his right to left arms, with at least one revolution in each hold.Teams earn fewer points if the woman's position and a change of hold is executed at the same time. They earn more points if the execution of the woman's position and the change in hold are "significantly different from lift to lift". Teams can increase the difficulty of lifts in any group by using a one-hand hold.

There are three types of positions performed by the woman: upright, or when her upper body is vertical; the star, or when she faces sideways with her upper body parallel to the ice; and the platter, or when her position is flat and facing up or down with her upper body parallel to the ice. The lift ends when the man's arm or arms begins to bend after he completes a full extension and when the woman begins to descend. If the woman changes position, from upright with her head upwards to upright with her head downwards, or from "Platter to Platter, Star to Star with half a rotation of the Woman in any direction", it is considered a change position. Pair teams earn more points if the variation of the woman's position in the air "significantly impacts the balance of the Woman in the lift or requires specific strength and/or flexibility", and "only if the variations are significantly different from lift to lift".

Carry lifts are defined as "the simple carrying of a partner without rotation" and do not count as overhead lifts; instead, they are considered as transition elements. They occur when the man makes at least one continuous revolution, although only the first carry counts towards their score. Carry lifts do not count as features in the short program and count towards the score only the first time they are performed during the free skate. Only half a revolution made by the man is allowed on the carry lift's take-off and/or exit. There are no restrictions of holds in carry lifts, and the "carrying of one partner by the other on the back, shoulders or knees is allowed". A simple carry lift lasts at least three seconds. A difficult carry includes at least one of the following features, for at least three seconds: the man skates on one foot, he performs crossovers, or he holds his partner on one arm, and he performs spread eagles or similar moves.

Pair skaters experience the most injuries of all figure skating disciplines. Off-ice training is crucial in making pair skaters more confident in their own skating and have more trust in their partners. Lifts are done on the floor before they are attempted on the ice, and the man's footwork is emphasized to ensure that his turns are accurate and safe for his partner. Their coaches also teach partners how to have firm wrist and finger grips, as well as how to communicate with each other non-verbally.

Twist lifts

Skate Canada calls twist lifts "sometimes the most thrilling and exciting component in pair skating". They can also be most difficult movement to perform correctly. Twist lifts require more strength and coordination than many other pair elements, and are usually the first or second element in a program. According to the ISU, the "Woman must be caught in the air at the waist by the Man prior to landing and be assisted to a smooth landing on the ice on a backward outside edge on one foot" during a twist lift. Pair teams begin a twist lift after "barreling down the ice backward"; the man then places both hands on his partner's waist, and she places both hands on his wrists. She begins the takeoff by jamming her toe pick into the ice, which launches her into the air. He attempts to get underneath the momentum of her jump, boosting her beyond where she would be able to reach on her own, without his assistance.

In their short programs, both senior and junior pair teams can perform two or three rotations in the air, but the woman can only perform either a flip or Lutz during her take-off. In the free skate, there are no limits on the amount of revolutions pair teams can perform, and the woman's take-off can include the Lutz, flip, toe loop, or Axel. (The toe loop and Axel are less common.) The woman completes the twist at the top of the twist lift by pulling her arms close to her body, crossing her legs together, and rotating freely in the air, high above her partner's head. During her rotations, he turns half a turn to catch her at the waist as she lands on the ice on the backward outside edge of one foot.

Judges look for the following when evaluating twist lifts: the speed at entry and exit; whether or not the woman performs a split position while on her way to the top of the twist lift; her height once she gets there; clean rotations; a clean catch by the man (accomplished by placing both hands at the woman's waist and without any part of her upper body touching him); and a one-foot exit executed by both partners. Pair teams can earn more points if the woman executes a split position (each leg is at least 45° from her body axis and her legs are straight or almost straight) before rotating. They also earn more points when the man's arms are sideways and straight or almost straight after he releases the woman. They lose points for not having enough rotations, one-half a rotation or more. According to former pair skater Archie Tse, stronger teams emphasize the delay between the man throwing the woman up in the air and reaching up to catch her by putting his hands down by his sides while she is in flight.

The first quadruple twist lift performed in international competition was by Russian pair team Marina Cherkasova and Sergei Shakhrai at the European Championship in 1977.

Dance lifts

The ISU defines dance lifts as "a movement in which one of the partners is elevated with active and/or passive assistance of the other partner to any permitted height, sustained there and set down on the ice". Dance lifts are delineated from pair lifts to ensure that ice dance and pair skating remain separate disciplines.

After the judging system changed from the 6.0 system to the ISU Judging System (IJS), dance lifts became more "athletic, dramatic and exciting". American ice dancer Charlie White states that lifts have become "increasingly difficult", requiring teams to, like pair skaters, work with acrobats to develop their lifts. They have also become more acrobatic, despite the fact that they do not get as high as pair skating lifts because ice dance lifts cannot be supported over the man's shoulder. Dance lifts have also become more dangerous, resulting in more falls and injuries.

There are two types of dance lifts: short lifts, which should be done in under seven seconds; and combination lifts, which should be done in under 12 seconds. There are four types of short lifts: the stationary lift, the straight-line lift, the Curve lift, and the Rotational lift. There are three types of combination lifts: two Rotational lifts in different directions, two Curve lifts performed in a serpentine pattern, and different two types of short lifts performed together.

Since dance lifts cannot be as high as pair lifts, a common dance lift is the standing lift, which occurs when the woman stands on her male partner. Injuries and falls occur, especially during training, but they tend to be minor because skating blades are thick, 0.15 inches to 0.25 inches in width, so the woman's weight, which should be balanced in the center of her blade, is distributed over a larger area of her partner's body. Ice dance teams practice lifts off the ice at first, and then women use blade guards and men wear foam guards under their clothing when they move to working on lifts on the ice. Eventually, the man's body adapts; he develops tolerance and calluses on his thighs and other body parts. Since ice dance lifts are shorter than pair lifts, the actual time the woman stands on the man tends to be about three seconds. Standing lifts are also easier than the more complex, acrobatic ice dance lifts.

Footnotes

References

Works cited
 Hines, James R. (2006). Figure Skating: A History. Urbana, Illinois: University of Illinois Press. .
 
"The 2022-23 Official U.S. Figure Skating Rulebook". (Rulebook) Colorado Springs, Colorado: U.S Figure Skating. July 2022. Retrieved 8 August 2022.
  "Special Regulations & Technical Rules Single & Pair Skating and Ice Dance 2022". International Skating Union. 2022. Retrieved 25 September 2022 (S&P/ID 2022)
"Technical Panel Handbook: Pair Skating 2022–2023" (PDF). (Tech Panel) International Skating Union. 15 July 2022. Retrieved 6 August 2022.

Lifts
Pair skating
Ice dance